Gustavo Kuerten defeated Magnus Norman in the final, 6–2, 6–3, 2–6, 7–6(8–6) to win the men's singles tennis title at the 2000 French Open. It was his second French Open title. The final was a rematch of the Rome final a month prior, in which Norman had prevailed.

Andre Agassi was the defending champion, but lost in the second round to Karol Kučera.

Seeds

Qualifying

Draw

Finals

Top half

Section 1

Section 2

Section 3

Section 4

Bottom half

Section 5

Section 6

Section 7

Section 8

Men's singles overview

External links
2000 French Open Men's Singles draw – Association of Tennis Professionals (ATP)
2000 French Open – Men's draws and results at the International Tennis Federation

Men's Singles
French Open by year – Men's singles
2000 ATP Tour